Charles Brewer may refer to:

Charles Brewer (baseball) (born 1988), American baseball player
Charles Brewer (American football) (1955), American college football player
Charles Brewer (businessman) (born 1959), American entrepreneur; founder of MindSpring Enterprises
Charles Brewer (boxer) (born 1969), American super middleweight boxer
Charles Brewer-Carías (born 1938), Venezuelan explorer and naturalist
Charles R. Brewer (1890–1971), Church of Christ professor, preacher, poet, and leader
Charles Brewer, namesake of C. Brewer & Co., a company in Honolulu, Hawaii

See also
Charley Brewer (disambiguation)